Exclusive Rights is a 1926 American silent crime film directed by Frank O'Connor and starring Gayne Whitman, Lillian Rich and Gaston Glass.

Cast
 Gayne Whitman as Stanley Wharton 
 Lillian Rich as Catherine Courtwright 
 Gloria Gordon as Mae Morton 
 Raymond McKee as Mack Miller 
 Gaston Glass as Flash Fleming 
 Grace Cunard as Nightclub Hostess 
 Sheldon Lewis as Bickel 
 Charles Hill Mailes as Booss Morris 
 Shirley Palmer as Sadie Towner 
 James Bradbury Jr. as Bat Hoover 
 Fletcher Norton as Garth 
 Jimmy Savo as Specialty Dancer

References

Bibliography
 Munden, Kenneth White. The American Film Institute Catalog of Motion Pictures Produced in the United States, Part 1. University of California Press, 1997.

External links

1926 films
1926 crime films
American crime films
Films directed by Frank O'Connor
American silent feature films
American black-and-white films
Preferred Pictures films
1920s English-language films
1920s American films